Karel Paulus (3 January 1933 – 31 October 2003) was a Czech volleyball player who competed for Czechoslovakia in the 1964 Summer Olympics.

He was born in Dolní Brusnice, Trutnov District and died in Bílá Třemešná, Trutnov District.

In 1964 he was part of the Czechoslovak team which won the silver medal in the Olympic tournament. He played all nine matches.

External links
 profile

1933 births
2003 deaths
Czech men's volleyball players
Czechoslovak men's volleyball players
Olympic volleyball players of Czechoslovakia
Volleyball players at the 1964 Summer Olympics
Olympic silver medalists for Czechoslovakia
Olympic medalists in volleyball
Medalists at the 1964 Summer Olympics